Natalya Yakovleva (born 29 September 1986) is a handball player from Kazakhstan. She plays on the Kazakhstan women's national handball team, and participated at the 2011 World Women's Handball Championship in Brazil.

References

External links

1986 births
Living people
Kazakhstani female handball players
Asian Games medalists in handball
Handball players at the 2006 Asian Games
Handball players at the 2010 Asian Games
Asian Games silver medalists for Kazakhstan
Medalists at the 2006 Asian Games
People from Shymkent
21st-century Kazakhstani women